The 1st Mississippi Infantry Regiment was a line infantry regiment of the Confederate States Army originally formed as a state militia unit in Mississippi.  The regiment was first organized at Corinth, Mississippi in April 1861 with a strength of 682 men.  By the following spring, the regiment had been augmented to the Confederate Army and fought primarily in the western theater of the war.  The majority of the regiment was recruited from Itawamba County in Mississippi.

The regiment's first major action was at the Siege of Corinth. By the time of the Battle of Nashville, the regiment had suffered heavy casualties and was under the command of Captain Owen Hughes who had previously been in command of Company K, known as the "Yankee Hunters".  Hughes and most of the remaining regimental members were killed at Nashville, after which the regiment was used for rear guard actions until disbanding in 1865.

See also
List of Mississippi Civil War Confederate units

References
 Itawamba County Historical Society

Units and formations of the Confederate States Army from Mississippi
1861 establishments in Mississippi
Military units and formations established in 1861